Thornwood is a master planned community of single-family homes and townhomes located in South Elgin, Illinois at the intersection of Silver Glen and Randall Roads on over  of land and centered on a $3.8 million clubhouse that is situated on  of land. Construction started in 1998 and finished in 2005, three years ahead of schedule.

References

Housing in the United States
Residential real estate
Planned communities in the United States